Norman Hammond (born 10 July 1944) is a British archaeologist, academic and Mesoamericanist scholar, noted for his publications and research on the pre-Columbian Maya civilization.

Career
Hammond was educated at Peterhouse, Cambridge. He held academic posts at Cambridge (1967–75), Bradford (1975–77), and Rutgers universities (1977–88), before he became a professor in the Archaeology Department at Boston University's College of Arts and Sciences (CAS) in 1988. Now retired at Boston, he is currently a Senior Fellow of the McDonald Institute for Archaeological Research at Cambridge.

He has been a visiting professor at the University of California at Berkeley, Jilin University (China), the Sorbonne and the University of Bonn.

Since 1968, he  worked in the Maya lowlands at the following sites in Belize, Central America: Lubaantun (1970–1971), Nohmul (1973–1986), Cuello (1975–2002), and La Milpa (1992–2002). As well as specialising in the archaeology of Maya lowland sites in Belize, he has written on the emergence of complex societies in general, and on the history of archaeology.

He has worked on the editorial boards of Ancient Mesoamerica and the Journal of Field Archaeology. He has also been the archaeology correspondent for The Times newspaper in London.

In 1998 he was elected as a corresponding Fellow of the British Academy (FBA), honouring his contributions to the field of Mayanist research.

Publications
Hammond's published books include:
 Lubaantun, 1926-70: The British Museum in British Honduras (1972, British Museum)
 Lubaantun: A Classic Maya Realm (1975, Harvard University Press for the Peabody Museum of Archaeology and Ethnology)
 Ancient Maya Civilization (April 1982, Cambridge University Press and Rutgers University Press, fifth edition released 1994)
 Nohmul: A Prehistoric Maya Community in Belize (December 1985, British Archaeological Reports)
 Cuello: An Early Maya Community in Belize (May 1991, Cambridge University Press)

Selected papers and articles
Some of the papers and articles published by Hammond include:

References

Additional reading

External links
 

British archaeologists
Mesoamerican archaeologists
British Mesoamericanists
Mayanists
20th-century Mesoamericanists
21st-century Mesoamericanists
Alumni of Peterhouse, Cambridge
Alumni of the University of Bradford
Academics of the University of Cambridge
Academics of the University of Bradford
Boston University faculty
Rutgers University faculty
University of California, Berkeley faculty
Academic staff of the University of Paris
1944 births
Living people
Corresponding Fellows of the British Academy
Contestants on University Challenge